Adolf Joszt (born 1889 in Lviv - 1957 in Gliwice) was a Polish chemist, considered to be a significant precursor to the practices of biotechnology and environmental protection.

1889 births
1957 deaths
Scientists from Lviv
Polish chemists
Lviv Polytechnic alumni
Lviv Polytechnic rectors